A franchise tax is a government levy (tax) charged by some US states to certain business organizations such as corporations and partnerships with a nexus in the state.  A franchise tax is not based on income.  Rather, the typical franchise tax calculation is based on the net worth of or capital held by the entity. The franchise tax effectively charges corporations for the privilege of doing business in the state.

Nexus
Whether or not a business must pay a franchise tax to a state in which it does business can cause some confusion. Some states report using both the economic and physical presence tests, and in some states, there are no written, public interpretations of their test at all.

Physical presence test
The physical presence test is based on Quill Corp. v. North Dakota, ( 504 U.S. 298 (1992)), a United States Supreme Court ruling concerning use tax. Quill Corporation is an office supply retailer. Quill had no physical presence in North Dakota (neither a sales force, nor a retail outlet), but it had a licensed computer software program that some of its North Dakota customers used for checking Quill's current inventories and placing orders directly. North Dakota attempted to impose a use tax on Quill, which was struck down by the Supreme Court, because Quill had no physical presence in North Dakota.

The Quill physical presence test is used by some states to determine whether or not a company must pay franchise tax. Delaware, Hawaii, Massachusetts, Pennsylvania, and Texas report using the physical presence test.

Economic presence test
Many states apply an "economic presence" test to determine whether a business will be subject to state sales or franchise tax. This test, which seems to contradict Quill, implied that States have the right to tax or "nexus" solely on the basis that a company has sales or otherwise derives an economic benefit from activities within their borders.

Amount
, about half the U.S. states do not impose a franchise tax. For states that have a franchise tax, the amount is often either a flat fee or based on the size of the business's total holdings.

Relationship to corporate tax
States with higher corporate income taxes usually have low or no franchise taxes and vice versa.

Delaware
The state of Delaware has a significant franchise tax. Other states have either nominal taxes or none at all.

See also
 California Franchise Tax Board

References

External links 
 Delaware Corporate Franchise Tax Calculator
 Texas Franchise Tax
 Louisiana Corporation Franchise Tax
 Delaware Franchise Tax

Corporate taxation in the United States
State taxation in the United States
Business taxes